Cosmosoma tigris is a moth of the subfamily Arctiinae. It was described by William Schaus in 1894. It is found in Venezuela.

References

tigris
Moths described in 1894